Julienne Marie Hendricks (born March 21, 1937), known professionally as Julienne Marie, is an American former actress and singer, best known for her work on the Broadway stage. In addition to her career in theater, Marie appeared in soap operas such as Our Private World (1965) and Ryan's Hope (1978).

Biography
Julianne Marie Hendricks was born to John Hendricks, a chemist, and his wife Ethel (née Gyurko). in Toledo, Ohio. Her mother was a stage mother who pushed her into performing at a very young age. She was named for her paternal grandmother, Julia Hendricks. She dropped her last name and changed Julianne to Julienne, using her first and middle names to create her stage name (Julienne Marie), as she thought the surname Hendricks sounded "too Midwestern". During her school years, she took piano lessons and participated in local pageants. She moved from Toledo to New York with her family where she started voice training at Juilliard.

Theatre
She made her Broadway debut in the original production of The King and I as the youngest of Yul Brynner's child brides. She received her first Tony Award nomination for Best Featured Actress in a Musical in 1959 for her portrayal of a young Indian maiden in Whoop-Up, which played 56 performances. Around 1960, she turned down a lead role in Lucille Ball's Wildcat to step into the original production of Gypsy as Louise, succeeding Sandra Church. Gypsy Rose Lee herself reportedly praised Julienne's performance. She performed 585 shows as Louise opposite Merman.

In 1963, she won a Theatre World award for her work in the off-Broadway revival of The Boys from Syracuse. In 1964, Julienne received her second Tony Award nomination for Best Featured Actress in a Musical for her work in Foxy starring Bert Lahr. Foxy played for 72 performances. In 1965, she starred in Do I Hear a Waltz?, alongside Elizabeth Allen; the show played 220 performances. Her final Broadway appearance came in 1980 for the musical Charlie and Algernon; the show played just 17 performances. In the late 1980s, she performed a cabaret act.

Personal life
She first wed Gerald Kean, a writer in 1955; later divorcing him in 1961. She met James Earl Jones while he was performing as Othello in 1964. They married in 1968 and divorced in 1972. Marie said that her marriage to Jones ended because they were apart too much due to work and Jones wanted children and she did not. She met advertising executive John Scanlon in the early 1970s and they married in 1974, remaining married until his death in 2001 at age 66 from a heart attack. The couple were patrons for the Ireland-based organization Concern Worldwide. After Scanlon's death, she relocated from Manhattan to a small village in France. Long retired from show business, and established a career as a psychotherapist later in life.

External links
 
 
 Julienne Marie at Internet Off-Broadway Database

References

1937 births
Actresses from Toledo, Ohio
Actresses from New York City
American musical theatre actresses
American soap opera actresses
American stage actresses
American expatriates in France
Cabaret singers
French women psychiatrists
French psychiatrists
Juilliard School alumni
Living people
Singers from Ohio
Singers from New York City
21st-century American women